Parsagadhi (Nepali: पर्सागढी ) is a municipality in Parsa District in Province No. 2 of Nepal. It was formed in 2016 occupying current 9 sections (wards) from previous 5(Baghbanna,BIRUWAGUTHI,Harpur,Panchrukhi,Bageswari Titrauna) former VDCs.
[[Main 
 It occupies an area of 99.69 km2 with a total population of 38,067.

References 

Populated places in Parsa District
Nepal municipalities established in 2017
Municipalities in Madhesh Province